Henriette Simon Picker (28 March 1917 – 5 January 2016) was an American painter, fashion designer, and inventor.

Biography

 
Henriette Simon Picker was born on March 28, 1917 to German-Jewish émigrés in Jersey City, New Jersey. In 1928, after a failed business venture, her father, William, moved his family to Berlin. There Picker graduated from the Paul-Natorp-Gymasium and later attended the Lette-Verein. After fleeing Germany following the rise of Hitler, the family resettled in New York, where Picker studied drawing and painting with Alexander Brook and Louis Bouché at the Art Students League of New York while pursuing a career as a shoe designer. At the age of sixteen, she became the first woman designer hired by I. Miller, a shoe company. In 1952 Picker opened her own business called "Simone Shoes To Match" with her brother Regi Simon, designing and manufacturing shoes for women to match their handbags and dresses. In the October 1952 issue of MaCall's, her shoes were illustrated by a then 24 year old Andy Warhol. In the 1960s she formed one of the first shoe import businesses in the US, and designed her own line, “Simone Shoes, Made in Italy.”  In 1982, Picker retired from shoe design to care for her then-ailing husband, Julian Picker. Soon thereafter, in 1983, Picker was commissioned to create the cover for the January 1983 issue of Footwear News.  Over the course of her career, Picker patented numerous shoe designs.

Picker produced the bulk of her paintings in her nineties. Her first solo exhibition was at the age of 95 at The Hudson River Studio in 2012, and shortly after was the subject of a retrospective exhibition at PMW Gallery in March 2013. She subsequently had solo exhibitions at The Cooperstown Art Association and View Arts in Old Forge, NY. She also exhibited at the Waxlander Gallery in Santa Fe and the Carter Burden Gallery in Chelsea. Picker's final years were almost entirely focused upon portraiture, including Ruth Bader Ginsburg, Mikael Karlsson (composer), Richard Croft (tenor), Ida Rohatyn, and Charles Wuorinen. A book chronicling her work entitled Henriette Simon Picker: A Century of Painting was published posthumously.

In 1940, she married Julian Picker who was a newswriter for CBS TV. They had three children, Ida Picker, Jon Picker, and Tobias Picker.

Paintings

References

External links
H. S. Picker's Website and Online Gallery

1917 births
2016 deaths
Jewish American artists
Jewish women painters
Jewish painters
21st-century American women artists
Artists from New York (state)
Painters from New York (state)
People from Jersey City, New Jersey
People from Poughkeepsie, New York
21st-century American painters
20th-century American women artists
American fashion designers
Shoe designers
American women fashion designers
Jewish fashion designers
American people of German-Jewish descent
21st-century American Jews